Archbishop Paul Bùi Văn Đọc (11 November 1944 – 6 March 2018) was a Vietnamese prelate of the Catholic Church. He served as the Archbishop of Ho Chi Minh City from 2014 to 2018 and the President of the Catholic Bishops' Conference of Vietnam from 2013 to 2016.

Biography
Paul Bùi was born on 11 November 1944 in Da Lat, Vietnam. In 1956, he started to study at a seminary in Sai Gon (now Ho Chi Minh City). He then continued his studies in philosophy and theology at the Pontifical Urbaniana University in Rome, from 1964 to 1970. He was ordained a priest on 17 December 1970 in Da Lat and served as the Rector of Minh Hoa Major Seminary from 1975 until he became Vicar General of Da Lat diocese in 1995.

On 26 March 1999, he was appointed Bishop of My Tho by Pope John Paul II and was consecrated by Jean-Baptiste Phạm Minh Mẫn, Archbishop of Ho Chi Minh City on 20 May the same year.

He was named Coadjutor Archbishop of Ho Chi Minh City on 28 September 2013 by Pope Francis. On 22 March 2014, he succeeded Cardinal Jean-Baptiste Phạm Minh Mẫn, upon the latter's resignation due to age limit. However, he was suffering from a stroke for a very long time before his death.

He died on 6 March 2018 in Rome, while participating in the ad limina visit of the conference of Vietnamese bishops. He was suspected of suffering a heart attack during a mass at the Basilica of Saint Paul Outside the Walls and was rushed to the San Camillo hospital where he died.

Other documents

See also 
Catholic Church in Vietnam

References

External links 
Catholic Hierarchy: Archbishop Paul Bùi Văn Đọc

1944 births
2018 deaths
People from Da Lat
21st-century Roman Catholic bishops in Vietnam
Pontifical Urban University alumni